I Don't Wanna may refer to:

 I Don't Wanna (album), a 1966 album by Henry Flynt & The Insurrections
 "I Don't Wanna" (Sham 69 song) (1997)
 "I Don't Wanna" (Aaliyah song) (1999)
 "I Don't Wanna", a 2001 song by Keke Wyatt from Soul Sista

See also
"I Don't Want To", a song by Toni Braxton